Międzybórz  is a village in the administrative district of Gmina Opoczno, within Opoczno County, Łódź Voivodeship, in central Poland.

Country has a neighbour of villages such as Mos Załężna, Sobawiny, Libiszów. By Międzybórz the east side of the river flows Drzewiczka.

In the years 1975-1998 town administratively belonged to the administrative region piotrkowskiego.
The village has an approximate population of 300.

History
In 1228, in time of war Henri I of Father Konrad. Region as a result of the disasters at the Rock and Wrocieryżem Mazowszanie took the opposite direction Plock. Then, the near Międzyborza crossing in order to protect their own troops by Pilicę Konrad relied on the surrounding hills. Despite the seizure by the prince Masovian dogodniejszych position to fight, he has been the third time with troops Henri Brodatego and was thus forced him to quickly withdraw from Malopolska and return to North America.

The first written about this village come from the sixteenth century.

John Grace - Chancellor great crown, the Archbishop of Gniezno, who lived in the years 1456-1531, remembers that from 1510 years Międzybórz belonged to the Roman Catholic parish in Libiszowie.

The next mention of the purchase and sale of land from the villages they come from the year:

 1799r. -- Because Międzybórz was then owned by John Lipnickiego and Basil Libiszewskiego.
 10 XII 1824r. -- Property Antoniny Felicjany with Lipnickich Libiszewskiej
 24 VI 1845r. -- Emilia Gasparska purchased from Michałowskich with children and Joseph Ksawerą
 6 V 1855r. -- Bought Ignatius de Gorszt Drużbacki and Joseph Gasparski
 8 VIII 1859r. -- Owner of Ignatius Gorszt-Drużbacki
 5 Nov. 1861r. -- Joseph bought Biernawski
 27 I 1862r. -- Again Ignatius de Gorszt-Drużbacki
 5 VII 1865r. -- Bought Szalma Kinkelstein

On 22.09.1968r. the court Libiszów Międzybórz went to the village land for uwłaszczenia włościan.

 19 XII 1872r. -- Joseph and Marianna bought Rudnicka
 9 III 1901r. -- Begins selling among farmers, among others, bought Louis Piekarski, Peter Kośka, Joseph Konecki

In the years 1948-1969, this village belonged to the National Council Gromadzkiej in Libiszowie, and in the years 1969-75 to Gromadzkiej of the National Council of the Bukowcu Opoczyńskim, and since 1975 belongs to the municipality of Meerut.

Other
A distinctive feature of Międzyborz firm is building houses on both sides of the road. It is a small district called Trompeter. In the village is 1 shop, 1 bet stolarski and 1 bet ślusarski.

References

Villages in Opoczno County